The 1981–82 Albanian National Championship was the 43rd season of the Albanian National Championship, the top professional league for association football clubs, since its establishment in 1930.

Overview
It was contested by 14 teams, and 17 Nëntori won the championship.

League table

Note: '17 Nëntori' is Tirana, 'Lokomotiva Durrës' is Teuta, 'Labinoti' is Elbasani, '31 Korriku' is Burreli and '24 Maji' is Përmeti.

Results

Season statistics

Top scorers

References

Albania - List of final tables (RSSSF)

Kategoria Superiore seasons
1
Albania